aka Tora-san's Stage-Struck is a 1978 Japanese comedy film directed by Yoji Yamada. It stars Kiyoshi Atsumi as Torajirō Kuruma (Tora-san), and Nana Kinomi as his love interest or "Madonna". Stage-Struck Tora-san is the twenty-first entry in the popular, long-running Otoko wa Tsurai yo series.

Synopsis
Tora-san returns from his travels throughout Japan to his family's home in Tokyo to find his uncle recovering from an illness. After a family fight erupts, he returns to the road and becomes friends with Tomekichi. When the pair come to Tokyo, they both fall in love with stage dancers.

Cast
 Kiyoshi Atsumi as Torajirō
 Chieko Baisho as Sakura
 Nana Kinomi as Nanako Beni
 Tetsuya Takeda as Tomekichi Gotō
 Masami Shimojō as Kuruma Tatsuzō
 Chieko Misaki as Tsune Kuruma (Torajiro's aunt)
 Gin Maeda as Hiroshi Suwa
 Hayato Nakamura as Mitsuo Suwa
 Hisao Dazai as Boss (Umetarō Katsura)
 Gajirō Satō as Genkō
 Hiroshi Inuzuka
 Raita Ryū as Detective
 Chishū Ryū as Gozen-sama
 Shinobu Azusa as Shinobu Fuji

Critical appraisal
Kiyoshi Atsumi was nominated for Best Actor at the Japan Academy Prize ceremony for his work in Stage-Struck Tora-san and the following film in the series, Talk of the Town Tora-san (also 1978). Yoji Yamada was also nominated for Best Director for these two films.

Stuart Galbraith IV writes that Stage-Struck Tora-san is one of the weaker entries in the Otoko wa Tsurai yo series. He notes that co-star Tetsuya Takeda, a popular comic actor in Japan at the time, comes across as hammy in western eyes. According to Galbraith, the film works best as a nostalgic look at late-1970s popular culture. The opening dream segment is a spoof of Close Encounters of the Third Kind (1977), and there are references to Pink Lady as well as glimpses into Japan's economic situation of the era. The German-language site molodezhnaja gives Stage-Struck Tora-san three out of five stars.

Availability
Stage-Struck Tora-san was released theatrically on August 5, 1978. In Japan, the film was released on videotape in 1996, and in DVD format in 2002 and 2005.

References
Notes

Bibliography

English

German

Japanese

External links
 Stage-Struck Tora-san at www.tora-san.jp (official site)

1978 films
Films directed by Yoji Yamada
1978 comedy films
1970s Japanese-language films
Otoko wa Tsurai yo films
Japanese sequel films
Shochiku films
Films with screenplays by Yôji Yamada
1970s Japanese films